Kothapalle is a village in Nandyal district in the state of Andhra Pradesh in India.

References 

Villages in Nandyal district